God's Child can refer to:

 Gods Child, a 1991-1996 American rock band
 "God's Child (Baila Conmigo)", a song from the 1995 Selena album Dreaming of You

See also
 God's Children (disambiguation)
 Child of God
 Children of God (disambiguation)